The canton of Grandvilliers is an administrative division of the Oise department, northern France. Its borders were modified at the French canton reorganisation which came into effect in March 2015. Its seat is in Grandvilliers.

It consists of the following communes:
 
Abancourt
Achy
Bazancourt
Beaudéduit
Blacourt
Blargies
Blicourt
Bonnières
Bouvresse
Briot
Brombos
Broquiers
Buicourt
Campeaux
Canny-sur-Thérain
Cempuis
Le Coudray-Saint-Germer
Crillon
Cuigy-en-Bray
Daméraucourt
Dargies
Élencourt
Ernemont-Boutavent
Escames
Escles-Saint-Pierre
Espaubourg
Feuquières
Fontaine-Lavaganne
Fontenay-Torcy
Formerie
Fouilloy
Gaudechart
Gerberoy
Glatigny
Gourchelles
Grandvilliers
Grémévillers
Grez
Halloy
Le Hamel
Hannaches
Hanvoile
Haucourt
Hautbos
Haute-Épine
Hécourt
Héricourt-sur-Thérain
Hétomesnil
Hodenc-en-Bray
Lachapelle-sous-Gerberoy
Lannoy-Cuillère
Lavacquerie
Laverrière
Lhéraule
Lihus
Loueuse
Marseille-en-Beauvaisis
Martincourt
Le Mesnil-Conteville
Moliens
Monceaux-l'Abbaye
Morvillers
Mureaumont
La Neuville-sur-Oudeuil
La Neuville-Vault
Offoy
Omécourt
Oudeuil
Pisseleu
Prévillers
Puiseux-en-Bray
Quincampoix-Fleuzy
Romescamps
Rothois
Roy-Boissy
Saint-Arnoult
Saint-Deniscourt
Saint-Germer-de-Fly
Saint-Maur
Saint-Omer-en-Chaussée
Saint-Pierre-es-Champs
Saint-Quentin-des-Prés
Saint-Samson-la-Poterie
Saint-Thibault
Saint-Valery
Sarcus
Sarnois
Senantes
Sommereux
Songeons
Sully
Talmontiers
Thérines
Thieuloy-Saint-Antoine
Villembray
Villers-sur-Auchy
Villers-sur-Bonnières
Villers-Vermont
Vrocourt
Wambez

References

Cantons of Oise